Milomir Odović (26 March 1955 – 14 December 2020) was a Bosnian professional football manager and player, best known for his playing and managing days at Bosnian Premier League club Željezničar, where he is a club legend.

As a player, Odović played as a left winger for the already mentioned Željezničar and Austrian clubs Linz and Spittal. As a manager, he managed a lot of Bosnian clubs, among others being Željezničar, Slavija Sarajevo, Borac Banja Luka, Velež Mostar and Čelik Zenica.

Playing career
Born in Ilijaš, a town just outside Sarajevo, in the SFR Yugoslavia on 26 March 1955, Odović started playing football there. As a talented youngster, he was asked to come and play for Željezničar, making his official debut for the club in 1974. Odović would go on to play almost 11 years for Željezničar, making 230 league appearances and scoring 22 league goals for the club. He was part of the Željezničar team that faced Velež Mostar in the 1980–81 Yugoslav Cup final.

He also played in Austria for Linz from 1985 to 1986 and for Spittal from 1986 to 1988. Odović ended his playing career in the summer of 1988 after leaving Spittal.

Managerial career
After the end of an active professional career as a player, Odović became a professional manager. He worked as a manager in Slavija Sarajevo on three occasions, who he led to a Republika Srpska Cup title in the 2005–06 season and were also the 2006–07 Bosnian Cup runners-up. Odović also managed Željezničar, Borac Banja Luka, Velež Mostar, GOŠK Gabela, Zvijezda Gradačac, Rudar Kakanj, Čelik Zenica and Olimpik.

He managed Željezničar where he left the position of manager on 27 November 2018 after 4 consecutive league losses in the 2018–19 season, but it was announced that Odović would however stay in the club and would coach the young players in Željezničar's academy.

Death
Odović died on 14 December 2020 at the age of 65, two years after being diagnosed with cancer.

Honours

Player
Željezničar
Yugoslav Second League: 1977–78 (West)

Manager
Slavija Sarajevo 
Republika Srpska Cup: 2005–06
Bosnian Cup runner-up: 2006–07

References

External links
Milomir Odović at Soccerway
Milomir Odović at Sofascore

1955 births
2020 deaths
People from Ilijaš
Serbs of Bosnia and Herzegovina
Association football wingers
Yugoslav footballers
FK Željezničar Sarajevo players
FC Linz players
SV Spittal players
Yugoslav First League players
Yugoslav Second League players
Austrian Football Bundesliga players
2. Liga (Austria) players
Yugoslav expatriate footballers
Expatriate footballers in Austria
Yugoslav expatriate sportspeople in Austria
Bosnia and Herzegovina football managers
FK Željezničar Sarajevo managers
FK Slavija Sarajevo managers
FK Borac Banja Luka managers
FK Velež Mostar managers
NK GOŠK Gabela managers
NK Zvijezda Gradačac managers
FK Rudar Kakanj managers
NK Čelik Zenica managers
FK Olimpik managers
Premier League of Bosnia and Herzegovina managers
Deaths from cancer in Bosnia and Herzegovina